Jaú River is a river of Amazonas state in north-western Brazil. It is a tributary of the Rio Negro, which itself is a tributary of the Amazon River.

Name

The name "Jaú" comes from that of one of the largest fish in Brazil, the gilded catfish or jau (Zungaro zungaro).

Basin

The  Jaú National Park was created in 1980 to protect an area of Amazon rainforest.
The park contains the entire Jaú River basin between the Unini River to the north and the Carabinani River to the south. All three rivers flow east to enter the right bank of the Rio Negro..
The Carabinani, which flows north to enter the Jaú River a few kilometres before that river enters the Rio Negro, forms the boundary between the Jaú National Park and the Rio Negro State Park North Section. The last section of the Jaú between the Carabinani and its mouth on the Rio Negro continues the boundary between the two parks.

See also
List of rivers of Amazonas

References

Sources

Rivers of Amazonas (Brazilian state)
Tributaries of the Rio Negro (Amazon)